Charles Edward Hodges (September 27, 1892 – May 1, 1968) was an American politician. He served as the Democratic President of the West Virginia Senate from Monongalia County from 1935 to 1939. 

He was the son of Thomas Edward Hodges, a noted academic. Hodges died in a hospital in Charleston, West Virginia on May 1, 1968, where he had been for over a month after suffering a heart attack in March.

References

West Virginia state senators
Presidents of the West Virginia State Senate
1892 births
1968 deaths
20th-century American politicians